A Sunday in September is a 1963 Swedish drama film directed by Jörn Donner. It is the first feature-length film directed by Donner.

The film follows a man named Stig (played by Thommy Berggren) and a woman named Birgitta (played by Harriet Andersson) through their short-lived marriage.

Harriet Andersson was widely praised by critics for her performance. The film was shown at the 24th Venice International Film Festival where it received the Opera Prima prize for best directoral debut.

External links

1963 films
1963 drama films
Films directed by Jörn Donner
Swedish drama films
1960s Swedish-language films
1963 directorial debut films
1960s Swedish films